Angel at Sea is a 2009 drama film directed by Frédéric Dumont. The film follows Louis, a 12 year-old boy, who lives a happy life with his parents and older brother in southern Morocco. The pivotal moment in the film is Louis' severely depressed father makes a shockingly candid confession to the boy. Louis then becomes a "guardian angel", obsessively watching over his father.

Production
The film was first released at the 44th Karlovy Vary International Film Festival on 7 July 2009, where it won the Crystal Globe, the Don Quijote Award, and where Olivier Gourmet won the Best Actor Award. In 2010, it received two nominations at the Jutra Awards, one at the Palm Springs International Film Festival, and in 2011 two further nominations at the 1st Magritte Awards in Belgium.

References

External links

2009 films
Belgian drama films
Canadian drama films
2000s French-language films
2009 drama films
French-language Canadian films
2000s Canadian films